James Draper may refer to: 

 James T. Draper Jr. (born 1935), former Southern Baptist Convention President
 James Draper (settler) (1618–1697), settler of the Massachusetts Bay Colony
 Jim Draper (James W. Draper, 1925–2006), Scottish golfer
 James Draper (umpire) (1925–2013), South African cricket umpire
 James "Bull" Draper, American football player and coach

See also 
 Draper (surname)